Qalin Tappeh is a village in the Ardabil Province of Iran.

References

 Tageo

Populated places in Ardabil Province